Anthony George Stanger (born 14 May 1968) is a Scottish former international rugby union player. With 24 international tries, he was Scotland's joint record try scorer, along with Ian Smith, until that record was broken by Stuart Hogg in November 2021. His regular playing positions were Wing and Centre.

Early life
Stanger was born in Hawick in the Scottish Borders. He attended university at the University of Edinburgh, where he earned a Bachelor of Science in Applied Sport Sciences – 1st Class Honours (1999).

Rugby career
Stanger played rugby for Scotland at under 18, 19 and 21 levels. He went on the Scotland rugby team's tour of Japan. He was selected to start for Scotland against Fiji in October 1989, without playing for the Scotland B side. He scored the winning try in the 1990 Five Nations match against England to seal Scotland's third Grand Slam. He played for Scotland at the 1991 and 1995 Rugby World Cups.

In 1997, Stanger was called up to replace Ieuan Evans, who was injured on tour with the British Lions in South Africa 1997, and Stanger gained one cap on the tour.

Later and personal life
Since retiring from playing, Stanger has moved on to other pursuits, mainly in the areas of coaching and guidance for professional sportspeople. He received an Honorary Degree of Doctor of Education from University of Edinburgh in June 2007.

Stanger worked as a Talent Manager with the Scottish Institute of Sport from 2008 to 2015, then served as Director at performance agency Stanger Pro alongside his New Zealand-born wife Bid. Their son George is a footballer who began his career at Stirling Albion before moving to Hamilton Academical in 2018, also being selected for New Zealand Under-20s.

References

External links
Tony Stanger International Statistics

1968 births
Living people
Alumni of the University of Edinburgh
Border Reivers players
British & Irish Lions rugby union players from Scotland
Edinburgh Rugby players
FC Grenoble players
Hawick Linden RFC players
Hawick RFC players
Leeds Tykes players
Rugby union players from Hawick
Rugby union wings
Scotland international rugby union players
Scottish rugby union players